The Heidt Tavern-Singleton House is a historic house in Wartrace, Tennessee, U.S.. It was built as a tavern run by Mr Heidt in 1790. In the early 1840s, it was purchased by Dr Robert L. Singleton, who expanded it into a house by the 1850s. The house was designed in the Federal and Greek Revival architectural styles. It has been listed on the National Register of Historic Places since July 24, 1991.

References

National Register of Historic Places in Bedford County, Tennessee
Federal architecture in Tennessee
Greek Revival architecture in Tennessee
Houses completed in 1790